The 1966 Wyoming gubernatorial election took place on November 8, 1966. Incumbent Republican Governor Clifford Hansen declined to seek a second term, instead opting to run for the U.S. Senate. Stanley Hathaway, the former Goshen County Prosecuting Attorney, won the Republican primary, and faced attorney Ernest Wilkerson, the Democratic nominee, in the general election. Despite the unfavorable national environment for Democratic candidates, Wilkerson was able to improve on Democrats' performance from the 1962 election, but not enough to defeat Hathaway, who won the election by a decisive margin.

Democratic primary

Candidates
Ernest Wilkerson, attorney
Bill Nation, State Representative
Jack R. Gage, former Governor of Wyoming
Raymond B. Whitaker, former Natrona County Prosecuting Attorney, 1960 Democratic nominee for U.S. Senate
Howard Burke, State Representative

Republican primary

Candidates
Stanley Hathaway, former Goshen County Prosecuting Attorney
Joe Burke, former State Representative
Arthur E. Linde, businessman

Results

References

Wyoming

1966
1966 Wyoming elections
November 1966 events in the United States